The Shalom Institute is a centre for educational excellence in the post-secondary school segment of the Jewish community, promoting Jewish identification, learning and development. It runs Shalom College, a residential college at the University of New South Wales, in Sydney, Australia.

External links
Official website

Educational organisations based in Australia
Religious organisations based in Australia